Haack is a German surname. Notable people with the surname include:

 Bruce Haack (1931–1988), Canadian musician and composer
 Dieter Haack (born 1934), German politician (SPD), federal minister for construction
 Fred C. Haack (c. 1873 – 1944), American politician
 Günther Haack (1929–1965), German actor
 Matt Haack (born 1994), American football player
 Morton Haack (1924–1987), American costume designer 
 Käthe Haack (1897–1986), actress
 Susan Haack (born 1945), English professor of philosophy 
 Wolfgang Haack (1902–1994),  German aerodynamicist

See also
 Sears-Haack body
 Vilsmeier-Haack reaction
 Haacke

German-language surnames
Surnames from nicknames